The Ikarus Aero 2 was a piston-engined military trainer aircraft built in Yugoslavia in the years following World War II, although the design pre-dated the war.

Design and development
The Ikarus Aero-2 was developed as a replacement for the Zmaj Fizir FN, which had been the most commonly used training aircraft of the Yugoslav Royal Air Force up until 1941. The Ikarus Aero-2 was designed by Boris Cijan and Đorđe Petković. Also at same time, was started project on two different aircraft, low-wing Ikarus MM-2 for advanced train and low-wing Rogožarski Brucoš for basic train. First flight test was made on April 20, 1940 and test pilot was Vasilije Stojanovic. 248 plane were eventually built, serving from 1948 to 1959 (380 built according to.

Powerplant was to be the de Havilland Gipsy Major because of its successful use in similar trainer aircraft built in other countries. The Aero 2 was a low-wing monoplane that seated the student and instructor in tandem, open cockpits (although later versions added a canopy to enclose them). Undercarriage was fixed and used a tailskid.

Variants
Aero 2B
 Open cockpit version with a 145hp (108kW) de Havilland Gipsy Major engine.
Aero 2BE
 Enclosed cockpit version with a 145hp (108kW) de Havilland Gipsy Major engine.
Aero 2C
 Open cockpit version with a 160hp (119kW) Walter Minor 6-III engine.
Aero 2D
 Enclosed cockpit version with a 160hp (119kW) Walter Minor 6-III engine.
Aero 2E
 Enclosed cockpit version with a 160hp (119kW) Walter Minor 6-III engine.
Aero 2F
 Open cockpit version with a 160hp (119kW) Walter Minor 6-III engine.
Aero 2H
 Twin-float version with a 160hp (119kW) Walter Minor 6-III engine.

Operators

Yugoslavian Air Force
1st Training Aviation Regiment (1945–1948)
3rd Training Aviation Regiment (1946–1948)
103rd Reconnaissance Aviation Regiment (1949–1951)
105th Training Aviation Regiment (1948−1949, 1951−1959)
267th Aviation Regiment of School of Reserve Officers (1951–1953)
122nd Hydroplane Liaison Squadron (1949–1959)
Training Squadron of 29th Aviation Division (1953–1961)
Training Squadron of 39th Aviation Division (1956–1959)
Training Squadron of 44th Aviation Division (1956–1961)
Liaison Squadron of 7th Aviation Corps (1953–1956)
Letalski center Maribor

Specifications (2B)

See also

References

Notes

Bibliography

External links

Photos and drawings at Ugolok Neba

Ikarus aircraft
1940s Yugoslav military trainer aircraft
Low-wing aircraft
Single-engined tractor aircraft
Aircraft first flown in 1940